Void of Vision are an Australian metalcore band from Melbourne, formed in 2013. The band consists of guitarists James McKendrick and Mitch Fairlie, drummer George Murphy, and vocalist Jack Bergin. Void of Vision have released two studio albums: Children of Chrome (2016) and Hyperdaze (2019).

History

Early years and Children of Chrome (2013–2016)
Void of Vision was formed in April 2013 by James McKendrick on lead guitar, Mitch Fairlie on rhythm guitar, George Murphy on drums, Matt Thompson on bass and Jack Bergin on vocals. In May of that year the band released a debut self-published two-track Reflect // Revolt on Bandcamp.

In 2014, the band caught the public's attention when they released the music video for their first single "Life//Blood" on 16 April. By the end of the year Void of Vision had performed three national tours. Their debut EP, Broken // Bones, was released in October and was named Blunt Magazines EP of the Year for 2014. On 27 December, Void of Vision released a new music video for their track "Persist // Perceive" from their EP, Broken // Bones, featuring Mason Bunt from the band Pridelands. The video contained live footage from Void of Vision's performance at The Resolve Tour with Hand of Mercy and Hellions.

On 5 March 2015, a music video for their track "Nightmare" was released via Elevnth Records. On 18 June, Void of Vision released a new single "Sunrise" alongside an accompanying music video.

In 2016, the band was signed on to the UNFD record label and later that year released the singles, "//" and "Ctrl Freak". Their debut studio album Children of Chrome followed on 30 September.

Disturbia and Thompson's departure (2017–2018)
In February 2017, Void of Vision marked their first international tour supporting Chelsea Grin on the Self Inflicted European Tour. On 9 November, the single "Ghost in the Machine" was released alongside an accompanying music video. Their second EP, Disturbia, was released a day later under UNFD. The band recorded a rendition of the 1995 song "Israel's Son" by Silverchair for Spawn (Again), a tribute album to Silverchair released on 17 November. From 17 to 25 November, Void of Vision co-headlined with Woolongong metalcore band Graves for their farewell tour. They performed at venues across Brisbane, Newcastle, Sydney, Wollongong, Adelaide and Melbourne. On 11 December, bassist Matt Thompson played his last show with the band before leaving for unknown reasons.

On 12 January 2018, Disturbia received a limited physical release of 500 vinyl EPs. On 29 November, Void of Vision released a new standalone single, "Kill All My Friends", alongside an accompanying music video. "Kill All My Friends" was described as being a new level for their sound, incorporating more industrial and experimental elements that frontman and vocalist Jack Bergin called "110% classic VOV with a new edge." In December, Void of Vision joined the lineup for the inaugural Good Things festival.

Hyperdaze (2019–2021)
On 28 June 2019, during an all ages show in Croydon, Void of Vision unveiled new music. On 23 July, their sophomore studio album Hyperdaze was announced alongside the new single "Hole in Me". The album was set to release on 13 September. On 16 August, Void of Vision released a cover of Slipknot's "Psychosocial" featuring Marcus Bridge of Northlane, Sean Harmanis from Make Them Suffer, and Ryan Siew from Polaris. The cover was included on the Slipknot cover compilation album, March of the Maggots, by Metal Hammer magazine. On 3 September, Void of Vision released their second single, "Babylon". On 9 September, their third single, "If Only", was released alongside an accompanying music video. On 14 September, they performed in the Amity Affliction's mini-festival Heaven & Hell. From October to December 2019, Void of Vision joined Northlane on their Australian and European legs of their Alien World Tour.

On 9 July 2020, the band released a music video for "Decay", the fourth single from Hyperdaze. The music video was created by the AV Club on no budget and was completely home-made. In a press statement, Bergin revealed that as his rental lease was finishing up they were left with an empty house to shoot the video in.

On 5 February 2021, Void of Vision teamed up with label-mate Thornhill's lead singer Jacob Charlton for a re-imagined version of "Year of the Rat" and also released a new music video. Later that month, they teamed up with Ecca Vandal for a new version of "Decay". The band are also expected to join the Amity Affliction on their Everyone Loves You… Once You Leave Them Australian Album Tour. These reimagined tracks were later revealed to be part of Hyperdaze (Redux) a remix album released on 5 March.

Chronicles EP series (2021–present)
On 3 September, Void of Vision released a new single titled "The Lonely People". A music video accompanied the released track.  On 20 October, another single, "VAMPYR" was released, with an accompanying music video. Void of Vision announced simultaneously that an EP would be released on 22 October, titled Chronicles I: Lust. The EP was then released on the aforementioned date, containing 4 tracks, including single releases, "The Lonely People" and "VAMPYR". Chronicles I: Lust will be the start of an ongoing series of EPs yet to be written. 

On 21 February 2022, Void of Vision released the new single, "Dominatrix", which was a slightly different endeavor for their sound. A second single, "Into the Dark" was released on 4 April alongside the announcement of their upcoming EP in the Chronicle series. On 29 April, their second EP in the series Chronicles II: Heaven was released. It featured the two previously released singles, as well as three additional tracks. The track "Altar" featured vocals from Creeper vocalist, Hannah Greenwood.

Musical style
Void of Vision has been described as taking their musical and lyrical influences from bands such as Parkway Drive, Architects, System of a Down, Rage Against the Machine and others. Their genre has been described as metalcore, heavy metal, and djent. Their live performances have been described as being aggressive and erratic.

Controversy 
On 4 February 2019, Wall of Sound released an article about US based metalcore band Glass Crown allegedly plagiarising Void of Vision's song "Ghost in the Machine". The song in question, titled "Lucid", featured similar guitar riffs almost identical to that in Void of Vision's song. A day later, Glass Crown frontman and songwriter Danny DiBella reached out to Wall of Sound, responding to the accusations. He refuted that he was not aware of "Ghost in the Machine" before writing "Lucid", and if he had known they sounded so similar "Lucid" would not exist. The track has since been removed online. Nick Brown from The Backbone Sunday Sessions podcast voiced support for DiBella and Glass Crown.

Members
Current
 Jack Bergin – unclean vocals 
 James McKendrick – lead guitar, clean vocals 
 Mitch Fairlie – rhythm guitar 
 George Murphy – drums 

Former
Matt Thompson – bass guitar, backing vocals 

Timeline

Discography

Studio albums

Remix albums

Extended plays

Singles

Album appearances

Music videos

Awards and nominations

AIR Awards
The Australian Independent Record Awards (commonly known informally as AIR Awards) is an annual awards night to recognise, promote and celebrate the success of Australia's Independent Music sector.

! 
|-
| 2022
| Chronicles I: Lust
| Best Independent Heavy Album or EP
| 
|

Notes

References

External links
Void of Vision on Bandcamp

2013 establishments in Australia
Australian metalcore musical groups
Musical groups established in 2013
Musical quintets
Musical quartets
Musical groups from Melbourne
UNFD artists